Antonius Wyngaerde (died 1499) was a composer associated with the city of Antwerp.  He was born in Utrecht.  He gained some reputation for his contrapuntal ability.

References

1499 deaths
Renaissance composers
Dutch male classical composers
Dutch classical composers
Musicians from Utrecht (city)
Year of birth unknown
Musicians from Antwerp